Devin Neal (born August 12, 2003) is an American football running back for the Kansas Jayhawks.

Early life and high school
Neal grew up in Lawrence, Kansas and attended Lawrence High School. As a senior, he rushed for 1,327 yards and 20 touchdowns and was named first team Class 6A All-State. Neal was rated a four-star recruit and committed to play both football and baseball at the University of Kansas over football offers from Iowa, Kansas State, Nebraska and Oklahoma State.

College career
Neal played in all 12 of Kansas's games during his freshman season and rushed for 707 yards and eight touchdowns on 158 carries. He became the first freshman in school history to be named the Big 12 Conference Offensive Player of the Week after rushing 24 times for 143 yards and three touchdowns and also catching two passes for 26 yards and one touchdown. Neal also played in seven games for Kansas's baseball team as a freshman. Neal was named the Jayhawks' starting running back entering his sophomore season. He was named the Doak Walker Award national running back of the week and the Big 12 Offensive Player of the Week after gaining 224 yards and scoring a touchdown on 32 carries and 110 yards on six receptions in a 37-16 over Oklahoma State. Neal was the first player to have at least 200 rushing yards and 100 receiving yards in the same game and the win made the Jayhawks bowl-eligible for the first time since 2008.

Neal has been named Honorable Mention All-Big 12 in each of his first two seasons.

References

External links
Kansas Jayhawks baseball bio
Kansas Jayhawks football bio

2003 births
Living people
American football running backs
Kansas Jayhawks baseball players
Kansas Jayhawks football players
Players of American football from Kansas
Sportspeople from Lawrence, Kansas